Rathri Mazha is a 2007 Indian Malayalam-language film by Lenin Rajendran starring Vineeth and Meera Jasmine in lead roles. Rathri Mazha was chosen as one of the Indian entries for the Asian, African and Latin American Competition segment of the 38th IFFI. The film won one National Film Awards and five Kerala State Film Awards .

Cast

 Vineeth as Hari
 Meera Jasmine as Meera
 Manoj K. Jayan
 Chitra Iyer
 Diya
 Lalu Alex as Balashankar
 Jagathy Sreekumar
 Sreekala Sasidharan
 Prem Prakash

Awards

National Film Awards
 Best Choreographer - Madu Gopinath, Saji Vakkom

Kerala State Film Awards
 Best Director - Lenin Rajendran
 Best Music Director - Ramesh Narayan
 Best Male Playback Singer-Srinivas
 Best Female Playback Singer -Sujatha
 Best Choreography - Madu Gopinath &  Saji Vakkom

References

External links
 

2007 films
2000s Malayalam-language films
Films featuring a Best Choreography National Film Award-winning choreography
Films directed by Lenin Rajendran